Ride is a 2014 American drama film written and directed by Helen Hunt. The film stars Hunt, Luke Wilson, Brenton Thwaites and Leonor Varela. The film had a limited release in theaters and was released on video on demand beginning on May 1, 2015 by Screen Media Films.

Premise
A mother travels cross-country to California to be with her son after he decides to drop out of school and become a surfer.

Cast 
 Helen Hunt as Jackie
 Luke Wilson as Ian
 Brenton Thwaites as Angelo
 Leonor Varela as Danielle
 David Zayas as Ramon
 Richard Kind as Boss
 Mike White as Roger
 Jay Huguley as Co-Worker
 Callum Keith Rennie as Tim
 Danielle Lauder as Karen

Production 
On July 30, 2013, Deadline reported that Helen Hunt would star, direct and produce her script of a surf film Ride. She produced the film with Greg Little and Lizzie Friedman. Upon closing of the distribution rights with Screen Media Films, it was announced that the film would be dedicated to her father and the film's surf-photographer Sonny Miller after his passing in 2014. In 2015, Hunt memorialised her friend and their experiences filming the surfing scenes in, "Sonny Miller's Lesson for Us All: 'Nature Dictates'", for The Huffington Post.

Filming 
The shooting of the film Ride began on August 5, 2013, at Venice Beach in Los Angeles.

Release
In September 2014, it was announced Screen Media Films had acquired distribution rights for the film with a planned 2015 release. The film had its world premiere at the AFM on November 8, 2014. The film also premiered at the San Francisco International Film Festival on April 25, 2015. The film was released in the United States in a limited release and through video on demand on May 1, 2015.

Reception
Ride received mixed reviews from critics. , the film holds a 50% approval rating on Rotten Tomatoes, based on 32 reviews with an average score of 5.97/10. The site's critical consensus reads, "Ride reaffirms Helen Hunt's immense acting talent -- but suggests that she still needs time to develop as a director." On Metacritic, the film has a score of 48 out of 100, based on 16 critics, indicating "mixed or average reviews".

References

External links 
 
 

2014 films
2014 drama films
American comedy-drama films
American surfing films
Films shot in Los Angeles
Films directed by Helen Hunt
Films about dysfunctional families
Films about mother–son relationships
2010s English-language films
2010s American films